Adoudou Konaté (born 14 April 1994) is a Malian international footballer who plays as a goalkeeper for the Mali women's national football team. She competed for Mali at the 2018 Africa Women Cup of Nations, playing in five matches.

References

1994 births
Living people
Malian women's footballers
Mali women's international footballers
Women's association football goalkeepers
21st-century Malian people